Lorenzo Pirola (born 20 February 2002) is an Italian professional footballer who plays as a centre-back for  club Salernitana, on loan from Inter Milan.

Club career

Inter Milan
Pirola joined the youth academy of Inter Milan in 2015. Pirola made his senior debut with Inter in a 4–0 Serie A win over SPAL on 16 July 2020.

Loan to Monza
On 5 October 2020, Pirola moved to newly-promoted Serie B side Monza on a one-year loan. He made his debut on 27 October 2020, in a Coppa Italia third round match against Pordenone; Monza won on penalties, with Pirola playing the whole 120 minutes. Pirola played his first Serie B match on 22 December, in a 2–0 win over Ascoli at home.

On 14 July 2021, Pirola re-joined Monza on another one-year loan, with an option to buy for Monza and a counter-option for Inter.

Loan to Salernitana
Pirola joined Salernitana in the Serie A on a one-year loan, with an option to buy and counter option in favour of Inter.

International career
Pirola is a youth international for Italy. He represented the Italy U17s at the 2019 UEFA European Under-17 Championship, where they came in second.

On 13 October 2020, he made his debut with Italy U21, playing as a starter in a qualifying match won 2–0 against the Republic of Ireland in Pisa.

Career statistics

Club

Honours
Inter Milan
 UEFA Europa League runner-up: 2019–20

Italy U17
 UEFA European Under-17 Championship runner-up: 2019
Individual
 UEFA European Under-17 Championship Team of the Tournament: 2019

References

External links
 Lorenzo Pirola Inter Milan profile
 Lorenzo Pirola Serie A profile
 
 
 
 
 

2002 births
Living people
People from Carate Brianza
Sportspeople from the Province of Monza e Brianza
Footballers from Lombardy
Italian footballers
Association football central defenders
Inter Milan players
A.C. Monza players
U.S. Salernitana 1919 players
Serie A players
Serie B players
Italy youth international footballers